Eric Matoukou (born 8 July 1983 in Yaoundé) is a Cameroonian football defender. He currently plays for Sprimont Comblain.

Regarded as one of the most accomplished defenders to play in the Belgian first division, he became an icon by winning both the Jupiler pro league and the Belgian cup.

Born in Yaounde, Eric Matoukou has played in the highest football league in Cameroon, Belgium, Ukraine, Finland and for the Cameroonian national team.

International 
He made his international debut on 9 February 2005, against Senegal, friendly match played in France.

Honours
Genk
Belgian Cup: 2008–09
Belgian Pro League: 2010–11

References

External links
 
 

1983 births
Living people
Cameroonian footballers
Association football defenders
Cameroon international footballers
R.W.D. Molenbeek players
K.R.C. Genk players
FC Dnipro players
FC Arsenal Kyiv players
FC Volyn Lutsk players
Lierse S.K. players
Pafos FC players
Belgian Pro League players
Challenger Pro League players
Ukrainian Premier League players
Cypriot First Division players
Cameroonian expatriate footballers
Cameroonian expatriate sportspeople in Belgium
Expatriate footballers in Belgium
Expatriate footballers in Ukraine
Cameroonian expatriate sportspeople in Ukraine
Expatriate footballers in Cyprus